Filippo Santoro is an Italian Roman Catholic prelate. He was made archbishop of Taranto in 2011.

References

21st-century Italian Roman Catholic archbishops
Living people
Year of birth missing (living people)